is a Japanese footballer who plays as a defender for  club Montedio Yamagata.

Career statistics

Club

Honours

Club
J1 League: 2021

References

External links

1997 births
Living people
People from Machida, Tokyo
Association football people from Tokyo
Toin University of Yokohama alumni
Japanese footballers
Association football defenders
J1 League players
J2 League players
Kawasaki Frontale players
Yokohama FC players
Montedio Yamagata players